Perilla ketone is a natural terpenoid that consists of a furan ring with a six-carbon side chain containing a ketone functional group.  It is a colorless oil that is sensitive to oxygen, becoming colored upon standing. The ketone was identified in 1943 by Sebe as the main component of the essential oil of Perilla frutescens. Perilla ketone is present in the leaves and seeds of purple mint (Perilla frutescens), which is toxic to some animals.  When cattle and horses consume purple mint when grazing in fields in which it grows, the perilla ketone causes pulmonary edema leading to a condition sometimes called perilla mint toxicosis.

Synthesis 
Perilla ketone was synthesized in 1957 by Matsuura from 3-furoyl chloride and an organocadmium compound similar to the Gilman reagent made from an isoamyl Grignard reagent and cadmium chloride. Perilla ketone has also been prepared in 74% yield via the Stille reaction from a 3-furyl-organotin compound and isocaproyl chloride in tetrahydrofuran solvent.

See also 
 Perillene

References 

3-Furyl compounds
Ketones
Monoterpenes